Miri people may refer to two ethnic groups of India:
Mising people in Assam and Arunachal Pradesh, also known as Plains Miri
Hill Miri people in Arunachal Pradesh